Songs of Her's is the debut compilation album by English indie pop band Her's. The nine-track album was released on 12 May 2017 through Heist or Hit Records. The compilation album consists of all of the band's recorded material up to that point, along with four new songs.

Background
In April 2016, Her's released their debut single "Dorothy". It was well received: Jamie Milton of DIY compared them to Wild Nothing, Beach Fossils and Ariel Pink. The next single, "What Once Was", was released the following month. In October, they released the single "Marcel", inspired by a lost ID card found in a wallet from a vintage shop. A review in The Line of Best Fit described the sound as a combination of British indie, tropical beach wave, and slacker rock. The next single, released in February 2017, was also reviewed in DIY. "I'll Try", the final single to be included on the album, was released in April 2017, and positively received in an NME  review.

Release and reception

Songs of Her's was officially released on 12 May 2017 to positive reviews from critics. In a four-star review, Will Fitzpatrick of The Skinny compared the album's sound positively to that of Mac DeMarco. Hassan Anderson of London in Stereo also compared the group's sound to DeMarco and to Frank Ocean, singling out new tracks "You Don't Know This Guy", "Medieval", and "Cool With You" as standouts.

Track listing
All music and lyrics by Her's.

Personnel
 Stephen Fitzpatrick – guitars, vocals, drum programming
 Audun Laading – bass guitar, backing vocals, drum programming

References

2017 albums